Lidiya Gavrilovna Ivanova (née Kalinina; ; born 27 January 1937) is a retired Russian artistic gymnast and international referee. She competed at the 1956 and 1960 Summer Olympics in all artistic gymnastics events. In 1956, she won a team all-around gold medal and a bronze medal in the now-defunct team portable apparatus exercise. In 1960, she finished within the first eight in all events, earning her second gold medal in the team all-around competition.
 
She was the all-around Soviet champion in 1958 and the world champion in the team all-around in 1958 and 1962; she also won a silver medal in the vault at the 1958 World Artistic Gymnastics Championships. She retired from competition in 1964 due to injury. In 1973 she graduated from the Moscow Institute of Physical Education with a degree of coach. She started working well before the graduation, heading the junior national team between 1970 and 1980. Between 1982 and 1992 she assisted with the senior national team and was its head coach at the 1992 Summer Olympics. In 1970 she became an international referee, and was selected as a judge at all Olympics between 1972 and 1992, as well as numerous world championships and other international competitions in between. After 1992 she worked as a sports commentator.

In 1959 she married Valentin Ivanov, a football player who won a gold medal at the 1956 Olympics. Their son Valentin (b. 1961), is a prominent football referee and retired football player.

She was awarded the Order of the Badge of Honour (1960, 1980), Medal "For Labour Valour" (1985) and Medal "Veteran of Labour" (1985). In 2008, she and her husband won the national "Slava" award of 2007.

References

1937 births
Living people
Soviet female artistic gymnasts
Gymnasts at the 1956 Summer Olympics
Gymnasts at the 1960 Summer Olympics
Olympic gymnasts of the Soviet Union
Olympic gold medalists for the Soviet Union
Olympic bronze medalists for the Soviet Union
Olympic medalists in gymnastics
Medalists at the 1960 Summer Olympics
Medalists at the 1956 Summer Olympics
Medalists at the World Artistic Gymnastics Championships